The Bougainville naked-tailed rat (Solomys salebrosus) or Bougainville giant rat is a species of rodent in the family Muridae.
It is found in Papua New Guinea and the Solomon Islands.

References

Solomys
Rodents of Oceania
Rodents of Papua New Guinea
Mammals of the Solomon Islands
Natural history of Bougainville Island
Endangered fauna of Oceania
Mammals described in 1936
Taxonomy articles created by Polbot
Taxa named by Ellis Le Geyt Troughton